Dejan Ristovski (born 1 August 1973) in Skopje is a former Macedonian football player.

International career
He made his senior debut for Macedonia in a June 2000 friendly match against South Korea and has earned a total of 3 caps, scoring no goals. His final international was a July 2000 friendly against Azerbaijan.

References

External links

1973 births
Living people
Footballers from Skopje
Association football forwards
Macedonian footballers
North Macedonia international footballers
FK Cementarnica 55 players
FK Vardar players
Macedonian First Football League players